Pashabhai Patel was an Indian politician. He was elected to the Lok Sabha, the lower house of the Parliament of India, as a member of the Swatantra Party.

He was the brother-in-law of Dahyabhai Patel, son of Vallabhbhai Patel.

References

External links
Official biographical sketch in Parliament of India website

India MPs 1967–1970
Lok Sabha members from Gujarat
1901 births
Year of death missing
Swatantra Party politicians